Entertainment Tonight (or simply ET) is an American first-run syndicated news broadcasting newsmagazine program that is distributed by CBS Media Ventures throughout the United States and owned by Paramount Streaming. ET also airs in Australia on Network 10.

Format
The format of the program is composed of stories of interest from throughout the entertainment industry, exclusive set visits, first looks at upcoming film and television projects, and one-on-one interviews with actors, musicians and other entertainment personalities and newsmakers.

A one-hour weekend edition, ET Weekend (known as Entertainment This Week until September 1991), originally offered a recap of the week's entertainment news, with most or all episodes later transitioning to center (either primarily or exclusively) around some sort of special theme; though the weekend edition now utilizes either format depending on the episode, most commonly, the format of those broadcasts consists of replays of stories that were shown during the previous week's editions.

ET Radio Minute, a daily radio feature, is syndicated by Westwood One.

As of 2021, the program's weekday broadcasts are anchored by Kevin Frazier and Nischelle Turner, while the weekend editions are anchored by Matt Cohen and Nischelle Turner along with Frazier.

History
In its early years from its 1981 inception, Entertainment Tonight – following a local newscast-style format – consisted primarily of coverage of the latest movies, music and television releases and projects.

They signed an exclusive agreement to cover the wedding of convicted child molester Mary Kay Letourneau, who married the student she had an affair with, Vili Fualaau; and attorney Howard K. Stern, who represented Daniel Birkhead in the Dannielynn Birkhead paternity case of the late Anna Nicole Smith's daughter Dannielynn. ET has also aired exclusive stories related to Anna Nicole Smith, including coverage of her funeral, and her surviving daughter.

In 1993, Entertainment Tonight had coverage of the premiere of "Emissary", the debut episode "Star Trek: Deep Space Nine". The premiere was the highest rated of syndicated series in television history.

In 1996, actor George Clooney decided to boycott Entertainment Tonight to protest the presence of intrusive paparazzi after Hard Copy did an exposé about his love life, violating an agreement that he had with Paramount, which produced and syndicated both shows. In a letter he sent to Paramount, Clooney stated that he would encourage his friends to do the same.

On September 8, 2008, Entertainment Tonight began broadcasting in high-definition television; concurrently, the program moved its production and studio operations from its longtime home at Stage 28 on the Paramount Pictures studio lot to Stage 4 at CBS Studio Center, one of the final steps involving the incorporation of Paramount's former syndication arm, Paramount Domestic Television, into CBS' distribution arms and the adoption of the then-new CBS Television Distribution name, which all took place following the breakup of CBS and the original Viacom into separate companies in December 2005.

After pressure via a social media campaign by actors Dax Shepard and Kristen Bell, ET announced in February 2014 that it would no longer accept footage or pictures of the children of celebrities from paparazzi photographers.

This show is the longest-running daily syndicated program.

In November 2018, CBS launched a free, 24-hour over-the-top streaming service known as ET Live; it features the correspondents from the linear show with expanded coverage of entertainment news. It is available via web browsers, apps, and most recently, the free streaming service Pluto TV (which added ET Live to its channel lineup in November 2019). 

In July 2022 it was announced that the service would be rebranded as Mixible, and continue to air a mixture of entertainment, lifestyle, and pop culture-related programming (including ET's The Download), but with expanded contributions from other Paramount Global properties such as MTV, VH1, Awesomeness, Comicbook.com, Inside Edition, and The Drew Barrymore Show.

On-air staff

Current on-air staff

Anchor 
 Kevin Frazier – weekday co-anchor/weekend co-anchor (2014–present; previously served as weekend co-anchor/correspondent from 2004 to 2011)
 Nischelle Turner – weekday co-anchor/weekend co-anchor (2021–present; previously served as correspondent/substitute weekday anchor from 2014 to 2021)

Correspondents
 Brooke Anderson – contributor/substitute weekday anchor (2019–present; previously served as substitute weekday anchor/correspondent from 2013 to 2015 and as contributor from 2015 to 2018)
 Deidre Behar - correspondent
 Matt Cohen - weekend anchor/correspondent/substitute weekday anchor (2019–present)
 Ash Crossan - correspondent
 Cassie DiLaura - correspondent (2022—present)
 Denny Directo - correspondent (2022—present)
 Will Marfuggi - correspondent (2022—present)
 Brice Sander - correspondent
 Rachel Smith – correspondent (2019–present)
 Lauren Zima - correspondent (2019–present)

Former on-air staff
 Thea Andrews – fill-in weekend host/correspondent (2006–2009; later at The Insider)
 Army Archerd – correspondent (1981; deceased)
 Alan Arthur - weekend co-host (1983–1984)
 Rona Barrett – correspondent (1983–1986)
 Chris Booker – correspondent (2002–2003)
 Lisa Canning – correspondent (1995–1998)
 Jann Carl – fill-in weekend host/correspondent (1995–2008)
 Steven Cojocaru – fashion correspondent (2003–2011)
 Leanza Cornett – correspondent (1994–1995, deceased)
 Rocsi Diaz – weekend co-anchor/correspondent (2013–2015)
 Steve Edwards - weekend co-host (1982–1983)
 Leeza Gibbons – fill-in host/correspondent (1984–1995; later at Extra and co-host of America Now)
 Garrett Glaser - correspondent (1989-1993)
 Bob Goen – co-host/correspondent (1993–2004; now at WCPO-TV in Cincinnati)
 Alan Hemberger – weekend co-anchor/correspondent (1981–1983; deceased)
 Tom Hallick – host/correspondent (1981)
 Bill Harris - correspondent (1984–1985, deceased)
 Samantha Harris – correspondent (2010–2012, 2015–2016)/weekend co-anchor/substitute weekday anchor (2015–2016, now back at Extra)
 Mary Hart – co-host/correspondent (1982–2011)
 Ron Hendren – original co-host (1981–1984)
 Huell Howser – correspondent (1982–1983; deceased)
 Keltie Knight – correspondent/fill-in weekend anchor/fill-in weekday anchor (2017–2021; now at E! News)
 Robin Leach – correspondent (1981–1984; deceased)
 Leonard Maltin – film historian/reviewer (1982–2010)
 Rob Marciano – weekday/weekend co-anchor (2013–2014; now at ABC News)
 Cameron Mathison – weekend anchor/correspondent (2015–2018; later co-host of Home & Family on Hallmark Channel)
 Maria Menounos – correspondent (2001–2005; later at Extra and E! News)
 Vanessa Lachey – correspondent (2005–2007)
 Julie Moran – correspondent (1995–2001)
 Nancy O'Dell – co-host/correspondent (2011–2019, later at PEOPLE, The TV Show!)
 Al Owens - correspondent/fill-in co-anchor (1984–1987)
 Carlos Ponce – correspondent (2004–2005)
 Tony Potts – correspondent (1998; later at Access Hollywood; now at CNN and HLN)
 Ahmad Rashad - fill-in weekend co-host (1988-1989); later host of Caesars Challenge and NBA Inside Stuff
 Michael Scott – fill-in host/correspondent (1993–1994)
 Carly Steel – correspondent (2016–2018)
 Mark Steines – co-host/correspondent (1995–2012; later co-host of Home & Family on Hallmark Channel)
 Andre Leon Talley – fashion correspondent (2012–2013, deceased)
 John Tesh – co-host/correspondent (1986–1996)
 Marjorie Wallace – host/correspondent (1981)
 Robb Weller – co-host/correspondent (1984–1986)
 Dixie Whatley – co-host/correspondent (1981–1982)
 Roshumba Williams – correspondent (2002)
 Jeanne Wolf - correspondent (1986–1990)
 Chris Wragge - correspondent (1996–1997, later at WCBS-TV in New York and co-anchor of The Early Show on CBS)

Competition
, despite competition from The Insider and even the more general-focus newsmagazine Inside Edition, both which are also produced by CBS Television Distribution, Entertainment Tonight remained among the ten highest-rated syndicated programs according to Nielsen ratings weekly ratings. During the 2007–08 season, the program's daytime ratings fluctuated between fourth and fifth place due to competition from fellow CBS-syndicated program Judge Judy.

International versions
The international rights are distributed by CBS Studios International.

References

External links
 
 

1981 American television series debuts
1980s American television news shows
1990s American television news shows
2000s American television news shows
2010s American television news shows
2020s American television news shows
English-language television shows
Entertainment news shows in the United States
First-run syndicated television programs in the United States
Television series by CBS Studios
Celebrity
Television series created by Al Masini
Operation Prime Time
Non-American television series based on American television series
Television shows remade overseas
Television shows filmed in Los Angeles